Javor Gardev is a Bulgarian stage and film director. He was born on February 23, 1972, in Sofia, Bulgaria.

Bio
Javor Gardev (Bulgarian: Явор Гърдев) holds an MPhil degree in philosophy from Sofia University, and MFA degree in theatre directing from the Bulgarian National Academy of Theatre and Film Arts. He has staged over forty-five performances in his home country and abroad. This includes Williams Shakespeare's Hamlet and King Lear, Edward Albee's The Goat or Who is Sylvia? and The Play about the Baby (officially endorsed by Edward Albee), Martin McDonagh's A Behanding in Spokane and The Pillowman, Tracy Letts' Killer Joe, Ethan Coen's Almost an Evening, among others.
Gardev has directed radio-drama and authored performance art and video artworks. His long feature debut film Zift (2008) won nineteen domestic and international awards and special mentions. Javor Gardev won the Silver St. George for Best Director in Main Competition at the 30th Moscow IFF. Zift was part of the selections of fifty-four international film festivals including Toronto IFF, 2008 (Official Selection, Discovery). It was Bulgaria's official entry for foreign-language Oscar and part of the Official Selection for the European Film Academy Awards, 2008. Until 2009 when its domestic record was broken, it was the highest grossing Bulgarian feature film since the prior two decades.

Since 2009 Javor Gardev is a member of the European Film Academy. In 2011 he founded Compania Ecstatica.

Film
In 2008 Gardev directed his first feature film, Zift. The film was produced by Miramar Film (Bulgaria), with the Bulgarian National Film Center and the Bulgarian National Television as co-producers. Gardev is slated to direct his second film, entitled Theseus, which will be a tale of the Greek mythological hero Theseus.

Theatre

Gardev has also directed over fifty plays. Among his most famous stage directions are: The Pillowman (2004), Caligula (2008), A Behanding in Spokane (2011), and Almost an Evening (2013).

DIRECTOR (Theatrical Productions)

2023 Shouldn't have said it! by Salomé Lelouch,
Baza X & Cinema Lumiere, Sofia

2022 Easter Wine by Konstantin Iliev,
The National Theatre of Bulgaria, Sofia

2021 Fitz Roy by Jordi Galceran,
World Premiere, Little City Theatre "Off the Channel", Sofia

2021 Castor by Javor Gardev as Part of The Interdisciplinary Performance Portraits of The Unknown by Petar Dundakov (composer), Javor Gardev (writer/director), Venelin Shurelov (stage designer), Produced by ViaFest & Varna Summer Festival, Varna

2021 The Tail after Zachary Karabashliev's Novel,
Drama & Puppet Theatre, Pleven

2020 Insulted.Belarus. by Andrei Kureichik,
Online Video Performance, Drama & Puppet Theatre, Pleven

2020 Homecoming by Harold Pinter,
Little City Theatre "Off the Channel", Sofia

2019 Hangmen by Martin McDonagh,
Macedonian National Theatre, Skopje, North Macedonia

2019 The Celebration by Thomas Vinterberg,
Mogens Rukov, Bo hr. Hansen, and David Eldridge,
Little City Theatre "Off the Channel", Sofia

2018 The Observers (a hypothesis on hereafter) by Konstantin Iliev,
The National Theatre of Bulgaria, Sofia

2018 The Dragon by Evgeniy Schwarz,
Varna Drama Theatre, Bulgaria

2018 Sleuth by Anthony Shaffer, 
Theatre of Nations, Moscow, Russia

2017 Chamkoria after Milen Ruskov's Novel, 
Theatre 199, Sofia, Bulgaria

2017 The Drunken Ones by Ivan Vyrypaev, 
Little City Theatre "Off the Channel", Sofia, Bulgaria

2015 The Seagull by Anton Chekhov,
National Palace of Culture, Theatre Azaryan, Sofia

2015 Quartet - Dangerous Liaisons After The End of The World,
Live Performance Movie by Javor Gardev Reimagining Heiner Muller's Play,
National Palace of Culture, Sofia

2014 Joan by Yaroslava Pulinovich,
The National Theatre, Sofia, Bulgaria

2013 Almost an Evening by Ethan Coen, 
Youth Theatre & Bright Light Entertainment, Sofia, Bulgaria

2012 Hamlet by William Shakespeare, 
The National Theatre, Sofia, Bulgaria

2012 Cancun by Jordi Galceran,
State Drama Theatre "Priyut Komedianta", Saint Petersburg, Russia

2012 The Moth by Peter Gladilin, 
The National Theatre, Sofia, Bulgaria

2011 The Ugly One by Marius von Mayenburg,
Saratov Academic Drama Theatre, Russia

2011 A Behanding in Spokane by Martin McDonagh,
The National Theatre, Sofia, Bulgaria

2011 Killer Joe by Tracy Letts, 
Theatre of Nations, Moscow, Russia
(Tour in Latvia.)

2010 The Gronholm Method by Jordi Galceran, 
Theatre of Nations, Moscow, Russia
(Tour in Ukraine.)

2009 The Goat, or Who is Sylvia? by Edward Albee,
The National Theatre, Sofia, Bulgaria

2008 Caligula by Albert Camus,
Co-production: & “La Rose des Vents” 
Scene Nationale Lille Metropole, Villeneuve d’Ascq, France
(Tours in France, Russia, Macedonia).

2008 Valentine’s Day by Ivan Vyrypaev, 
Little City Theatre "Off the Channel", Sofia, Bulgaria

2007 The Old Woman from Calcutta by Hanoch Levin, 
Theatre 199, Sofia, Bulgaria

2006 Krum by Hanoch Levin, 
Varna Drama Theatre, Varna, Bulgaria

2006 Koutzoulan ou La Sainte Vierge aux Loups by Konstantin Iliev, (mise en espace), 
Panta Theatre, Caen, France

2006 King Lear by William Shakespeare, 
The National Theatre, Sofia, Bulgaria
 
2005 The Play About the Baby by Edward Albee,
Theatre 199, Sofia, Bulgaria

2004 The Tempest by William Shakespeare, 
Adana State Theatre, Turkey
(Tours in Bulgaria and France.)

2004 The Pillowman by Martin McDonagh, 
Varna Drama Theatre, Varna, Bulgaria
(Tours in Russia, Serbia and Montenegro, Kosovo Autonomy.)

2003 Life x 3 by Yasmina Reza 
Theatre 199, Sofia, Bulgaria

2003 Marat/Sade after Peter Weiss, 
Multilateral co-production of Triumviratus Art Group, Varna Drama Theatre – Bulgaria, Association THEOREM, Hebbel Theater – Berlin, “La Rose des Vents” 
Scene Nationale de Villeneuve d’Ascq – France, Stadsschouwburg Utrecht – Netherlands
(Tours in Germany, France, Belgium, Netherlands, Macedonia.)

2002 In the Air after Alexej Schipenko, 
Haskovo Drama and Puppet Theatre, Haskovo, Bulgaria

2001 Bastard after William Shakespeare, Friedrich Dürrenmatt and Adso of Moutier-an-Der,
Produced by Varna Drama Theatre in the Underground Wine Cellar ‘Dimyat’, Varna, Bulgaria

2000 Nosferatu, celui du dedans after David Le Breton,
Theatre du Plessis-les-Tours / Companie Jose Manuel Cano Lopez, Tours, France

2000 Verona by Alexej Schipenko, 
The National Theatre, Sofia, Bulgaria

1999 Russian People's Post by Oleg Bogayev, 
Bulgarian Army Theatre, Sofia, Bulgaria
(Tour in Poland.)

1999 Quartet by Heiner Müller,
Theatre-laboratory “Sfumato”, Sofia, Bulgaria
(Tours in Switzerland, France, Netherlands, Portugal, Macedonia.)

1997 Somnium Ulixis after Heiner Müller, Joseph Brodsky, and K. Merjanski,
Theatre-laboratory "Sfumato", Sofia
(Tours in Germany and Romania.)

1996 Tanya-Tanya by Olya Moukhina,
Little City Theatre "Off the Channel", Sofia, Bulgaria
(Tour in Romania.)

1995 The March by Georgi Tenev, 
State Drama Theatre, Lovech, Bulgaria

1995 The Maids by Jean Genet, 
Haskovo Drama Theatre, Dimitrovgrad Drama Theatre, Theatre-laboratory “Sfumato”, Sofia, Bulgaria

1994 Parts of the Night by Georgi Tenev, 
Sliven Drama Theatre, Sliven, Bulgaria
 
1994 Two Little Plays about the End after F.M.Dostoievski and L.Petrushevskaia,
Dimitrovgrad Drama Theatre (co-directed with Nedyalko Delchev), Bulgaria

ACTOR (Theatrical Productions)

1999 The young Bataille in Story of the Eye by Georges Bataille, directed by Ivan Stanev
(Co-production: Passages” Festival, Nancy / "Concept for theatre" foundation, Sofia)

1997 Germancho in Apocrypha, authors’ performance of M. Mladenova & Ivan Dobchev
(Co-production: Theatre-laboratory “Sfumato”, Sofia / “Passages” Festival, Nancy, France)

1993 Leonce in Leonce and Lena by Georg Büchner, directed by Galin Stoev (Theatre-Studio “Studentina”, Sofia, Bulgaria)

1992 Cherubino in The Marriage of Figaro, directed by Nikola Petkov (Theatre-Studio “Studentina”, Sofia, Bulgaria)

1988 Peyko in The Big Treasure by Pancho Panchev, directed by Nikolay Aprilov (Pioneers’ Palace Theatre Studio, Sofia, Bulgaria)

1987 First Duck in Anna’s Tales by Stefan Tsanev, directed by Nikolay Aprilov (Pioneers’ Palace Theatre Studio, Sofia, Bulgaria)

1986 Bonny The Clown in Laughter In The Circus, directed by Nikolay Aprilov (Pioneers’ Palace Theatre Studio, Sofia, Bulgaria)

1985 The Artist Abenitto and Citizen 2 in Gelsomino in The Liars’ Country after Gianni Rodari, directed by Nikolay Aprilov (Pioneers’ Palace Theatre Studio, Sofia, Bulgaria)

1984 The Buck Goat in The Yellow Eye by Nikola Rusev, directed by Nina Svetoslavova (Pioneers’ Palace Theatre Studio, Sofia, Bulgaria)

1983 Huckleberry Finn in Tom Sawyer by Mark Twain, directed by Bogdan Krasinski (Pioneers’ Palace Theatre Studio, Sofia, Bulgaria)

ACTOR (ТV § Film)

2019 – Roussinov in The Father’s Day, Directed by Pavel Vesnakov
(Six Episodes TV Series, Bulgarian National Television & Agitprop)

1989 – Joshua Muller in Watch On The Rhine by Lillian Hellman
(Two Episodes TV Production, Bulgarian State Television)

1988 – Gottfried Klepperbein in Little Adventures
after Erich Kästner’s novella Anna Louise and Anton 
(Ten Episodes TV Series Production for Children, Bulgarian State Television)

1987 – The Boy in The Kite by Rada Moskova
(Two Episodes TV Film for Children, Bulgarian State Television)

1984 – The Boy in Grandad, Grandma, Bread Roll and Grandchildren
(TV Film for Children, Bulgarian State Television)

1983 – Emil The Space in “To Everyone” by Dragan Maramski
(TV Novella for Children, Bulgarian State Television)

Opera

DIRECTOR (Opera)

2015 La Rondine (The Swallow) by Giacomo Puccini,
Sozopol Summer Academy of Arts,
Darina Takova Foundation

TV & Radio

DIRECTOR (Radio Plays)

2005 D.J. by Georgi Gospodinov, 
(Bulgarian National Radio)

2003 The Gate of Europe co-directed by D. Wedel / V. Vrhovnik / Javor Gardev,
(Co-production: Danish Radio / Croatian Radio / Bulgarian National Radio - in English -)

2000 The Citadel audio-project of Assen Avramov / Georgi Tenev / Javor Gardev,
(Co-production: Bulgarian National Radio / Triumviratus Art Group / Ars Digital)

1999 The Atoll audio-project of Javor Gardev / Assen Avramov / Georgi Tenev, 
(Co-production: Bulgarian National Radio / Triumviratus Art Group / Ars Digital) 
Awarded “Grand Prix - Best European Radio Drama” Berlin ’99, Germany

ACTOR (Radio Plays)

2014 Chief in-command of Sofia Airport in Flying Help by Angel Karaliychev & Matvey Valev
(Bulgarian National Radio)

ANCHOR (TV & Radio)

1989-1991 Youngster, Radio Show for Teenagers, Anchor
(Bulgarian Radio, BR)

1988 Class of Everything, Teenager Program, Anchor
(Bulgarian Television, BT)

1987 Motley Roundabout, Morning Radio Show for Children, Anchor
(Bulgarian Radio, BR)

1984-1988 Pioneeria, Children Program, Anchor
(Bulgarian Television, BT)

Performance Art
AUTHOR & PERFORMANCE ARTIST

2021 Portraits of The Unknown by Petar Dundakov (composer), Javor Gardev (writer/director), Venelin Shurelov (stage designer), 
Produced by ViaFest @ Varna Summer Festival

2006 Party Headquarters
Literary & Video Performance Based On Georgi Tenev's Book 

2005 Visual Police 
video-performance

Presented or exhibited at:
- Wuertenbergische Kunstverein, Stuttgart – 2006
- Kunsthaus, Dresden – 2006
- Schauspielhaus, Hanover – 2006
- Deutsche Schauspielhaus, Hamburg - 2006
- ATA Gallery - Institute of Contemporary Art, Visual Seminar, Sofia - 2005

2002 Michael Jackson’s Nightmare,
"One Magazine" Photographic & Video Performance & Publication, Sofia

2002 Danube Games,
"One Magazine" Conceptual Mystification Performance & Publication, Sofia

1998 Doppelmond oder Ihre Sprache im Koerper unserer Sprache 
literary and video performance together with the writers Georgi Tenev and Dubravka Ugresic
Gallery of Akademie Schloss Solitude, Stuttgart

1995 Tiger’s Funeral 
open-air performance on the roof of Sliven Drama Theatre, Bulgaria

1994 Entrance Into The Night 
open-air performance on the roof of Sliven Drama Theatre, Bulgaria

Video
AUTHOR'S VIDEOS

2020 Insulted.Belarus. by Andrei Kureichik, Online Video Performance
Produced by Drama & Puppet Theatre, Pleven

2002 Oh Sweet Home of Mine / Discovery Channel Redone” – 1min., supershort
Produced by Triumviratus Art Group
Co-produced by Euroscreen 21

2000 Bedspotting – 8 min., short
Produced by Triumviratus Art Group
Co-produced by Companie Jose Manuel Cano Lopez, Tours, France
Co-produced by Pro Helvetia

1998 Der Solitudebolero oder Raskolnikowbesessenheit – 33 min., short
Produced by Akademie Schloss Solitude, Stuttgart, Germany

Artistic & Educational Residencies

2021-22 Fulbright Award, Visiting Research Fellow at Northwestern University, Evanston, IL, USA

2003 Goethe Institut, Berlin, Germany

2001 Academy for Educational Development, State Department, USA

2000 Château Royal de Plessis-lèz-Tours, Tours, France

1998 Akademie Schloss Solitude, Stuttgart, Germany

1996 European Directors School, Leeds, United Kingdom

Teaching
MASTERCLASSES & WORKSHOPS

2020/21 Javor Gardev, Directing Classes, National Academy For Theatre And Film Arts, Sofia, Bulgaria

2020 Javor Gardev, Acting Classes, New Bulgarian University, Sofia, Bulgaria

2019 Javor Gardev, Acting Classes, New Bulgarian University, Sofia, Bulgaria

2018 Javor Gardev, Playwriting Laboratory with the Winners of New Bulgarian University’s Contemporary Play Contest, Sofia Bulgaria

2017 Javor Gardev, Lecture, Documentary Theatre Project «N/TRY 17», Red House, Sofia (with Jana Rasheva & Georgi Tenev)

2017 Javor Gardev, Masterclass, Stage And Film Directing, Studio Of Individual Directing MIR-5, Moscow, Russian Federation

2015 Javor Gardev, Masterclass, Performing Daniil Harms, Sozopol Summer Academy Of Arts, Sozopol, Bulgaria

2015 Javor Gardev, Theatrical Workshop, "Performing “Hamlet”, Montfiz Winter Festival, Velingrad, Bulgaria

2014 Javor Gardev, Theatrical Workshop, "King's Ghost", Gdansk Shakespeare Festival, Gdansk, Poland

2014 Javor Gardev, Theatrical Workshop, "Performing “Hamlet”, New Bulgarian University, Sofia, Bulgaria

2013 Javor Gardev, Theatrical Workshop, "Almost An Evening", Youth Theatre & Art Office, Sofia, Bulgaria
 
2012 Javor Gardev, Theatrical Workshop, "Rehearsing “Hamlet”, Sofia University Cultural Centre, Bulgaria

2008 Javor Gardev, International Theatrical Master Class, Territoria International Festival, Moscow, Russian Federation
 
2006 Javor Gardev, International Theatrical Workshop “Declaration d’amour”, 'Performing A.P. Chekhov' at Theatre Ephemeride, Val de Reuil, Normandie, France
 
2004 International Theatrical Workshop “Mozart, Don Juan, Puschkin und Ich”, Javor Gardev's Class "Performing Alexander Pushkin", Trebnitz Castle, Brandenburg, Germany
 
2002 International Theatrical Workshop “Penthesilea”, Javor Gardev's Class "Performing Heinrich von Kleist", Trebnitz Castle, Brandenburg, Germany

2000 Javor Gardev, Creative Journey Lab “Nosferatu, The One Inside”, With French Actors From Central Region, Theatre du Plessis-les-Tours, Company Jose Manuel Cano Lopez, Tours, France

1999 Javor Gardev, Workshop "Chekhov’s Seagull", Duke University, University of Chapel Hill, North Carolina, USA

Affiliations
Since 2011 – Affiliated Stage Director, Drama League of New York, USA

Since 2009 – Member of the European Film Academy

Since 1994 – Triumviratus Art Group (founder & member)

2005 - 2001 – Bulgarian Theatre Directors Association (founder & member)

Stage and Screenwriting

PLAYWRITING (AUTHOR)

2021 Castor, A Short Play by Javor Gardev, Produced by ViaFest & Varna Summer Festival

2005 Night Labor, A Short Play by Javor Gardev

In: “Sprung in die Stadt” - DuMont Literatur und Kunst Verlag

Edition in German: 

In: “Leap into the City” - DuMont Literatur und Kunst Verlag

Edition in English: 

1993 The Suicider, A Monologue by Javor Gardev

PLAYWRITING (CO-AUTHOR)

1999 The Cat of The Baskervilles by G. Tenev, J. Gardev, and I. Siromahov

1993 Phonologos by G. Tenev & J. Gardev

1992 Bologne by G. Tenev & J. Gardev

SCREENWRITING (CO-AUTHOR)

2015 Icaria by Sergey Kaluzhanov & Javor Gardev

2014 The Red and The Black by Michael Brando & Javor Gardev after Stendhal

2014 Hamlet by Michael Brando & Javor Gardev after William Shakespeare

2011 The Brood by Joe Nienalt & Javor Gardev

Articles

SELECTED ARTICLES (AUTHOR)

Javor Gardev, "God Complex or Caligula Phenomenon", In: "Philosophia", 3/91, pp.39-44, Sofia, 1991

Javor Gardev, "Theocentrism or Egocentrism", In: "Philosophical Thought", 12/91, pp.32-34, Sofia, 1991

Javor Gardev, "Peyo Yavorov's Queens оf The Night", In: "Text And Meaning: Literary Analyses", pp.122-126, Sofia University Publishing House, 1992

Javor Gardev, "From Fraternal Mound to Mons Veneris: Rehabilitation of an Injured Erotism", "Kultura Weekly“, Sofia, 02/02/1996
http://newspaper.kultura.bg/media/file/phpxBWjV34852.pdf

Javor Gardev, „British Theatre is dead! Long Live British Theatre!”, "Kultura Weekly“, Sofia, 07/26/1996
http://newspaper.kultura.bg/media/file/phpzIUIt75801.pdf

Javor Gardev, "Sadomasochism: Love Deprived of Its Method“, "Kultura Weekly", Sofia, 10/18/1996
http://newspaper.kultura.bg/media/file/phpmGDpwZ3318.pdf

Javor Gardev, "Ecstatic Theatre", In: "Democratic Review", vol.34, Winter 97/98, pp.664-686, 1998

Javor Gardev, "The Unbearable Lightness of Being Barbarian", "Subsol" Online, 2000
http://subsol.c3.hu/subsol_2/contributors/gardevtext.html

Javor Gardev, "For A New Ecstatic Theatre", In: "Artmargins" Art Magazine, 05/18/2000 
https://artmargins.com/for-a-new-ecstatic-theater/

Javor Gardev, "Night Labor", Short Play, In: "Leap Into The City", DuMont Literatur und Kunst Verlag, pp.129-139, Cologne, 2006

Javor Gardev, "An Interview with Edward Albee" In: L'Europeo Bulgaria, Issue #31 / Reality, 2012
http://javorgardev.com/wordpress/2015/01/01/3675/

Javor Gardev, "The Art оf Balance", In: "Bulgaria & Romania: 10 Years In The European Union", pp.109-119, Plovdiv 2019 Foundation - European Capital of Culture & Timisoara – European Capital of Culture Association, 2017
http://plovdiv2019.eu/en/news/183-10-year-anniversary-of-bulgaria-and-romania-in-the-eu

Translations

ENGLISH-TO-BULGARIAN (TRANSLATOR)

1992 Central Government, Alan Jamieson, Bell & Hyman (1978)

RUSSIAN-TO-BULGARIAN (TRANSLATOR)

2014 Joan, A Play by Yaroslava Pulinovich, (2013)

1994 Foma Bobrov And His Spouse, A Comedy by Daniil Kharms, (1931)

1994 The Isolation Box, A Dialogue by Lyudmila Petrushevskaya, (1988)

1991 Love, Vladimir Mayakovsky, (1926)

1991 And Yet, Vladimir Mayakovsky, A Futurist Poem (1914)

1991 A Few Words About My Wife, Vladimir Mayakovsky, A Futurist Poem (1913)

1991 They Understand Nothing, Vladimir Mayakovsky, A Futurist Poem (1913)

1991 Autobiographical letter, Vyacheslav Ivanov, (1917)

1991 Wagner and The Dionysian Act, Vyacheslav Ivanov (1905)

1991 New Masks, Vyacheslav Ivanov (1904)

1991 Nietzsche and Dionysus, Vyacheslav Ivanov (1904)

1990 The Hellenic Religion of the Suffering God, Vyacheslav Ivanov, (1904)

Awards

2022 Best Performance of the Year / Academy ASKEER Award - The Tail

2022 Best Director of a Satirical Performance / “Golden Kukerikon” Award for The Tail

2021-22 Fulbright Award: Visiting Fulbright Fellow at Northwestern University, IL, USA

2020 Bulgarian Cultural Event of The Year 2020 / Popular Vote Winner – Homecoming / Ploshtad Slaveykov Online Magazine Poll

2020 Best Performance of the Year / Union of Bulgarian Performing Artists IKAR Award for The Celebration

2018 Best Comedy & Satire / "Golden Kukerikon" Award for Chamkoria

2018 Best Director Award / Vratza Chamber Theatre Festival for Chamkoria

2018 Best Performance of the Year / Union of Bulgarian Performing Artists IKAR Award for The Drunken Ones

2016 Best Director of the Year / Union of Bulgarian Performing Artists IKAR Award for Quartet - Dangerous Liaisons After The End of The World & The Seagull

2014 Best Director, Best Performance & Best Cast / Golden Harlequin Awards - The Ugly One

2013 Best Performance of the Year / Academy ASKEER Award - Hamlet

2013 Best Director of the Year / Academy ASKEER Award for Hamlet

2013 Best Director of the Year / Union of Bulgarian Performing Artists IKAR Award for Hamlet

2012 Best Performance of the Year / Academy ASKEER Award - The Moth

2012 Best Director of the Year / Academy ASKEER Award for The Moth & Behanding in Spokane

2011 Varna Theatrical Award “Golden Mask”

2010 MK Newspaper Award “Upcoming Masters”, Best Performance – The Gronholm Method

2009 Award of the Society of the Independent Theatre Critics – The Goat, or Who Is Sylvia?

2009 Salerno IFF – “Tohno” Award – Zift

2009 Bulgarian National Film Center & Filmmakers Union Annual Award – Best Film - Zift

2009 16th Palic EFF – International Critics’ Jury Award - Zift

2009 09th Wiesbaden goEast Festival – Special Mention Director's Achievement - Zift

2009 14th Vilnius IFF - Best Director Award - Zift

2009 13th Sofia IFF - Special Award of the International Jury - Zift

2009 13th Sofia IFF - Kodak Award for Best Bulgarian Feature Film - Zift

2008 28th Golden Rose Film Festival - Grand Prix “Golden Rose” for Best Film in Competition - Zift

2008 28th Golden Rose Film Festival - Special Award of the Bulgarian Cinema Critics Association - Zift

2008 33rd Plovdiv ITVF - “Golden Chest” Special Prize of the Jury - Zift

2008 33rd Plovdiv ITVF - “Academica 21” Award for Director's Achievement - Zift

2008 33rd Plovdiv ITVF - “Galya Bachvarova” Award for Director's Achievement - Zift

2008 30th Moscow IFF - “Silver St. George” Best Director in Main Competition - Zift

2008 30th Moscow IFF - Film Clubs Federation Award for Best Film - Zift

2006 Award of the Society of the Independent Theatre Critics in Bulgaria - Theatre Person of The Year for King Lear and Krum

2006 Best Performance of the Year / Academy ASKEER Award for King Lear

2006 GOLDEN AGE Award for contribution to Bulgarian Arts and Culture

2006 Best Director of the Year / Union of Bulgarian Performing Artists IKAR Award for The Play about the Baby

2005 Memorable Medal of Ministry of Culture of Turkey / The Tempest tour in France

2005 GOLDEN QUILL Award of FM Classic Radio, Municipality of Sofia, and Ministry of Culture of Bulgaria for contribution to Bulgarian Culture.

2006 Best Director Award / Vratza Chamber Theatre Festival for The Play about the Baby

2005 Best Performance Award / Vratza Chamber Theatre Festival for The Pillowman

2005 Best Director Award / Vratza Chamber Theatre Festival for The Pillowman

2004 Municipality of Sofia Award for exceptional contribution to Arts and Culture / Life X 3

2002 Best Performance of the Year / Academy ASKEER Award for Bastard

2002 Best Director of the Year / Academy ASKEER Award for Bastard

2002 Best Director of the Year / Union of Bulgarian Performing Artists IKAR Award for Bastard

1999 Berliner Grand Prix Europe / Best European Radio Drama for The Atoll

1999 Best Director Award  / Vratza Chamber Theatre Festival for Quartet

1999 Best Director Award / Blagoevgrad Annual Theatre Festival for Quartet

1997 Best Director of the Year / Union of Bulgarian Performing Artists Annual Award for Tanya-Tanya
 
1997 Best Director Award / Blagoevgrad Annual Theatre Festival for Tanya-Tanya

1991 National Highschools Literary Competition / First Prize for Best Essay

1991 National Highschools Philosophy Contest Winner / Philosophers Society

References

1972 births
Bulgarian film directors
Living people